Mealticket was an American ska punk band, formed in the San Fernando Valley area of Southern California, United States, in late 1991. Although part of the larger third wave ska revival, Mealticket offered a unique sound thanks to its serious musicianship, complex compositions, and silky, jazz influenced female vocals.

History
The band formed in 1991 in Van Nuys, California and consisted of members of the Van Nuys High School Marching Band.  The members of the band in 1991 were Alfie Larreau (saxophone and vocals), Edwin Portillo (bass guitar) Bill Meadows (guitar), Richard Ferreria (Trombone),  Derrick Conyers  (Trumpet), Chris Taylor (Drums) and David Ferreria (keyboards and guitar).

After playing their first gig at the Natural Fudge Cafe in Los Angeles in 1991, the line-up went through some shifts as Edwin and Alfie left the band and David switched to bass.The band went through a number of singers before the band was joined by Genai Canale in 1992.  The band often played shows at the Cobalt Cafe on Sherman Way in Canoga Park.

Mealticket began playing the Orange County ska scene regularly in 1994.  That same year they released their debut CD Misconceptions. Influenced by the American punk rock scene, the band decided to release the album DIY on their own label "Pork 'n Beans Records."  Soon thereafter, the CD became a hit among the rapidly growing national ska scene.

In 1995, Mealticket went through another lineup change as Derrick and Chris left the band.  They were replaced by Jim Cushnie on saxophone and Carlos De La Garza (formerly from the OC band Suburban Rhythm) on drums on the interim.  Mealticket's next permanent drummer, Dennis Leipert, joined shortly thereafter.  This new lineup recorded and released the second Mealticket CD 13 Apologies in 1996.

In 1996, Mealticket changed guitar players.  The new guitar player, Ricky Estrada, recorded the last Mealticket release Lisa Marie.  Unlike the previous two releases, Lisa Marie was released by Asian Man Records.

The band's relationship with Asian Man Records also yielded a Japanese release Superpositive, a retrospective of the band's earlier releases.  It was to be the band's last release.  Mealticket disbanded in 1997 amicably.

Discography

Studio albums

EP's / 7" vinyl releases

Compilations

Pushover
Members of Mealticket went on to form the basis of Pushover. This band was also signed to Asian Man Records and release two albums.

References

External links
Mealticket on Myspace

Third-wave ska groups
American ska musical groups
Asian Man Records artists